The Greater London Women's Football League is an amateur competitive women's association football competition based in Greater London, England. The league is affiliated with the Amateur Football Alliance, Middlesex County Football Association, and London Football Association. Matches are played on Sundays.

The league is at Tier 7 of the women's pyramid. It promotes to the London and South East Women's Regional Football League, and does not relegate to any league.

Teams
The teams competing during the 2020–21 season are:

References

External links
Official website

6
Football competitions in London
Women's sport in London